Oelenberg Abbey is a Trappist monastery located in Reiningue near Mulhouse, France. It has been an important place of worship in Alsace since the 11th century but now hosts a small community of five monks (as of 2017).

The former Augustinian then Jesuit church with its nave, its two-level transept, its choir and its burial vault were listed as a Historic Monument on June 16, 1992.

History
In 1046, a priory of the Canons Regular of St. Augustine was founded by Heilwig of Dabo, Countess of Eguisheim and mother of Pope Leo IX. The latter dedicated the church in 1049. The abbey was originally a double monastery. In 1273, the nuns left for Cernay. In 1626, the abbey was handed over to the Jesuit college of Freiburg im Breisgau, then in 1774 to the University of Freiburg, until the community was suppressed and the site sold off as national property during the French Revolution. In 1825, a group of Cistercian monks from Kleinburlo Abbey, Darfeld in the Rhineland, settled in the buildings. They founded a daughter house at Mariawald in Germany in 1862.

During the First World War, a major part of Oelenberg Abbey was destroyed by bombing on June 26, 1915. The church, the organ of Rinckenbach and the conventual buildings suffered extensive damage. The abbatial church and the convent were re-built in 1920 by architect Paul Kirchacker of Mulhouse using the remains of the church. The choir stalls carved by Théophil Klem were scrupulously restored.

In 1925, the community founded Engelszell Abbey in Austria.

During the Second World War in November–December 1944, the abbey was partly destroyed. The French artillery wanted to spare the monastery, but had to bomb an observatory built by the Germans in the bell tower of the church.

In 1951, a new organ was built by Georges Schwenkedel.

In 1970, a manuscript was discovered in the monastery containing 54 tales collected by the Brothers Grimm. The Grimms had sent the manuscript in 1810 to the German writer Clemens Brentano, who never sent it back to them. Although the Brothers Grimm kept a copy of the book, it had since disappeared. This manuscript, known as the 1810 Manuscript or the Oelenberg Manuscript, is thus the first known extant version of Grimms' Fairy Tales. It is now kept at the Bodmer Library in Cologny in the canton of Geneva, Switzerland.

In 2016, the organ of the abbatial church was restored.

As of 2017, the abbey has five monks, one oblate brother and two novices.

The life at Oelenberg is led by the Ora et labora ("Pray and work") practice of the Rule of Benedict interpreted by the Cistercian tradition.

Architecture
The abbatial church has Romanesque, late Gothic and Baroque elements from the 12th century, 1486 and 1755 respectively. It is adorned with a 12th-century processional cross, a 14th-century crucifix, and two statues of the Virgin Mary of the 15th and 18th centuries.

The three chapels of Saint Michael, Saint Leo and the Mount of Olives (Ölberg in German, formerly Oelenberg) feature elements of the 12th century and of 1486, as well as a painting and a reliquary that come from Lucelle Abbey which was dissolved during the French Revolution.

Organ
The organ of the abbatial church was made in 1951 by Georg Schwenkedel. It replaced an older instrument that was built in 1904 by Martin and Joseph Rinckenbach and destroyed by a bombing in 1915. The organ has 22 registers, two transmissions and two keyboards with a pedal.

 Coupling: I/I (super-octave), II/I (also in sub-octave and super-octave), I/P, II/P (also in super-octave)

List of Cistercian abbots of Oelenberg
 Eugène de Laprade, titular prior in 1795, abbot 1808 – 15 June 1816
 Petrus Klausener (Pierre Klausener), 10 November 1832 – 28 June 1850
 Ephrem van der Meulen, 1 August 1850 – 1 March 1884
 Andreas Zucktriegel, 31 March 1884 – 14 September 1889 (19 February 1893)
 Franziskus Strunk, 27 September 1889 – 1 January 1912
 Petrus Wacker, 29 January 1912 – 15 November 1949
 Robert Laverdure, 15 December 1949 – 22 June 1951
 Bernard Benz, 17 July 1951 – 12 September 1954
 Paul Offtinger, Sup. ad nutum 20 September 1954 – 20 September 1957
 François Rubrecht, Sup. ad nutum 24 September 1957 – 20 June 1959, abbot 20 June 1959 – 6 June 1971
 Stanislas Nicot, 2 July 1971 – 27 July 1980
 Eugène Manning, Sup. ad nutum 30 July 1980 – 14 February 1981, abbot 14 February 1981 – 6 April 1987
 Alphonse van den Broucke, Sup. ad nutum April 1987 – 27 December 1989
 Simon Carrère, Sup. ad nutum 22 January 1990 – 26 January 1991, abbot 26 January 1991 – 1 July 2003
 Antonio Lépore, Sup. ad nutum 1 July 2003 – 8 June 2004, abbot 8 June 2004 – 4 August 2012
 Théophane Lavens, Sup. ad nutum 29 Sep. 2012 – 3 July 2014
 Dominique-Marie Schoch, Sup. ad nutum 4 July 2014, abbot since 31 March 2017

List of superiors and abbesses of Oelenberg
 1825–1826: Hélène Van den Broeck
 1826–1848: Stanislaus Schey
 1848–1854: Joséphine Merklin (12 May 1802, Thann27 May 1854)
 1854–1860: Humbeline Clercx (first abbess)
 1860–1863: Pelagia Faulhaber
 1863–1866: Elisabeth Van De Grootveen
 1866–1881: Hieronyma Liétard
 1881–1881: Raphael Lichtle
 1882–1895: Scholastika Dibling

See also
 List of Cistercian monasteries in France
 List of Jesuit sites

References

Bibliography
 In French
 

 In German
 
 .

External links

 Official website 
 Oelenberg, orden-online.de 

Trappist monasteries in France
1046 establishments
Churches in Haut-Rhin
Monuments historiques of Haut-Rhin